Manchester City Football Club is an English association football club based in Manchester, which competes in the Premier League. Founded as West Gorton (St Marks) in 1880, the club after several changes of identity adopted the name 'Manchester City' in 1894. During the 1891–92 season, Manchester City joined the Football Alliance. The team was elected to The Football League in 1892, where the club remained until 1992, when the League's First Division was replaced as the top level of English football by the Premier League.

Manchester City's first team has competed in a number of nationally contested leagues, and its record against each club faced in these competitions is listed below. The team that Manchester City has met most in league competition is Arsenal, against whom they have contested 188 league matches. Arsenal have also defeated Manchester City in league competition on 87 occasions, which represents the most Manchester City have lost against any club. Manchester City have defeated  Everton on 72 different occasions in the league, more times than they have defeated any other club in league fixtures - City have played Everton 178 times. Manchester City have drawn more matches with Manchester United than with any other club; out of the 166 league matches between the two teams, 52 have finished without a winner.

City have scored 268 league goals against Newcastle United (170 games). They have conceded 306 goals against Liverpool (in 172 games). Their worst win % against current Premier League teams is also against Liverpool (26.2%), while their best win % is against both Brighton and Watford (both 66.7%)

Key
The records include the results of matches played in the Football Alliance (from 1891 to 1892), The Football League (from 1892 to 2002) and the Premier League (since 1992). Wartime matches are regarded as unofficial and are excluded, as are matches from the abandoned 1939–40 season. Test matches are not included. The 1999 Second Division play-off final is regarded as an away match for the purposes of classification in this table.
For the sake of simplicity, present-day names are used throughout: for example, results against Newton Heath, Small Heath and Woolwich Arsenal are integrated into the records against Manchester United, Birmingham City and Arsenal, respectively.
  Clubs with this background and symbol in the "Club" column are competing in the 2021–22 Premier League alongside Manchester City.
  Clubs with this background and symbol in the "Club" column are defunct.
P = matches played; W = matches won; D = matches drawn; L = matches lost; F = Goals scored; A = Goals conceded; Win% = percentage of total matches won

All-time league record
Statistics correct as of matches played at the end of the 2021–22 season.

Overall record
''
The table that follows is accurate as of the end of the 2021–22 season for all competitions. It excludes war competitions.

Footnotes

References

League Record By Opponent
Manchester City